Kysyl-Syr (Kıhıl Sıır) is an urban locality (an urban-type settlement) in Vilyuysky District of the Sakha Republic, Russia, located  from Vilyuysk, the administrative center of the district. As of the 2010 Census, its population was 3,106.

History
Urban-type settlement status was granted to it in 1974.

Administrative and municipal status
Within the framework of administrative divisions, the urban-type settlement of Kysyl-Syr is incorporated within Vilyuysky District as the Settlement of Kysyl-Syr. As a municipal division, the Settlement of Kysyl-Syr is incorporated within Vilyuysky Municipal District as Kysyl-Syr Urban Settlement.

References

Notes

Sources
Official website of the Sakha Republic. Registry of the Administrative-Territorial Divisions of the Sakha Republic. Vilyuysky District. 

Urban-type settlements in the Sakha Republic